Candonopsis is a genus of ostracod in the family Candonidae. The genus has a cosmopolitan distribution.

Taxonomy
The following species are recognised in the genus Candonopsis:
 †Candonopsis alagoensis Tomé, Lima Filho & Neumann, 2014
 Candonopsis aula Karanovic, 2004
 †Candonopsis carthaginensis Trabelsi et al., 2020
 Candonopsis dani Karanovic & Marmonier, 2002
 Candonopsis dedeckkeri Karanovic, 2007
 Candonopsis inaffecta Karanovic, 2007
 Candonopsis indoles Karanovic, 2004
 Candonopsis kimberleyi Karanovic & Marmonier, 2002
 Candonopsis linnaei Karanovic, 2008
 Candonopsis mareza Karanovic & Petkovski, 1999
 Candonopsis murchisoni Karanovic & Marmonier, 2002
 Candonopsis pilbarae Karanovic, 2007
 Candonopsis westaustraliensis Karanovic & Marmonier, 2002
 Candonopsis williami Karanovic & Marmonier, 2002

References

External links

Candonidae